The family Stromateidae or butterfish contains 15 species of fish in three genera. Butterfishes live in coastal waters off the Americas, western Africa and in the Indo-Pacific.

The endemic New Zealand species Odax pullus is commonly called butterfish, but is from a separate family Odacidae. The Japanese butterfish Psenopsis anomala is from the separate family Centrolophidae.  The African butter catfish is also known as the butter fish. In South Australia, the Argyrosomus japonicus is commonly called butterfish as well.

Species
 Genus Pampus
 Silver or white pomfret, Pampus argenteus (Euphrasen, 1788); Synonym: P. cinereus (Bloch, 1795).
 Chinese silver pomfret, Pampus chinensis (Euphrasen, 1788): 
 Pampus echinogaster (Basilewsky, 1855).
 Southern lesser pomfret, Pampus minor Liu & Li, 1998.
 Pampus punctatissimus (Temminck & Schlegel, 1845).
 Genus Peprilus
 Gulf butterfish, Peprilus burti Fowler, 1944.
 Pacific harvestfish, Peprilus medius (Peters, 1869).
 Shining butterfish, Peprilus ovatus Horn, 1970.
 Harvestfish (American harvestfish) Peprilus paru (Linnaeus, 1758).
 Pacific pompano, Peprilus simillimus (Ayres, 1860).
 Salema butterfish, Peprilus snyderi Gilbert & Starks, 1904.
 Atlantic butterfish (aka American butterfish), Peprilus triacanthus (Peck, 1804).
 Genus Stromateus
 Southwest Atlantic butterfish, Stromateus brasiliensis Fowler, 1906.
 Blue butterfish, Stromateus fiatola Linnaeus, 1758.
 Starry butterfish, Stromateus stellatus Cuvier, 1829.

Timeline

Mislabelling
Escolar is sometimes fraudulently labelled as butterfish. This can be more hazardous than other fish mislabeling due to the potential health effects of escolar.

References

 

 
Taxa named by Constantine Samuel Rafinesque